Al-Nasr is one of the areas  of the Greater Amman Municipality, Jordan.

References 

 

Districts of Amman